Exilim is a brand of digital cameras introduced in 2002 by Casio.

The Exilim Card series was notably thinner than other small digital cameras at the time of its introduction, typically 10–15 millimetres thick compared to other manufacturers' comparable models that were 25–35 millimeters thick. This sparked competition to make slimmer compact digital cameras, with other manufacturers bringing out lines of comparably thin cameras from 2004.

On April 24, 2018, Casio ceased the production of its digital cameras, including the Exilim brand following the loss of some 500 million yen that ended in March 2017.

Features
The Exilim Card series are ultra-compact models. The cameras were first branded as "Wearable Card Cameras" and are about the size of a credit card and 9 mm-16 mm thick. The early models only had digital zoom, though more recent models have optical zoom as well.

The Exilim Zoom series is the all-purpose line, all including an optical zoom. Several newer models support H.264 video compression which uses much less storage than Motion JPEG format.

The Exilim Professional is the bridge digital camera line, with higher-quality optics and greater zoom.

All models use Secure Digital (SD) or Multi Media Card (MMC). They come with a small amount of internal memory and are not bundled with a memory card. Many Exilim cameras come with a bundled charging and docking cradle. The cradle is used to recharge the camera's battery and to connect the camera to a PC or PictBridge compatible printer.

Images are recorded as JPEGs with Exif data. Raw images from the CCD are not available by default, though on some models a service menu can be accessed allowing images to be recorded as the raw data.

The cameras use a Casio "proprietary" lithium ion battery. All the later models have 2.5" or wider LCD screens and come with more than 20 shooting modes.

MPEG-4 video with H.264 compression 

In 2007, several Exilim models introduced support for highly compressed H.264 video in 848×480(HQ Wide), 640×480(HQ/Normal), 320×240(LP) modes.  One benefit of H.264 is that it uses much less storage than Motion JPEG, a widely-used video format for consumer digital cameras.  However, videos are deliberately limited to 10 minutes in China, DI, and EU, because of customs import tariffs discriminating between picture and movie cameras.

Exilim models such as the EX-Z1200 that incorporate MPEG-4 video benefit from extended recording times due to higher quality compression. On "normal" quality, MPEG-4 allows more than an hour of 640×480, 30frame/s video to be recorded on a 1 GB memory card.

High-speed photography
Some cameras allow high-speed photography. The EX-FC100 and EX-FS10 allow taking short bursts of 30 pictures per second and shooting video up to 1000 frames per second, the EX-FH20 offers bursts of 40 pictures per second and 1000 frame/s video, and the EX-F1 offers bursts of 60 pictures per second and video of 1200 frame/s. However, the resolution of the video decreases drastically with increasing speed; in case of EX-F1, 300 frame/s are at 512×384 pixels, 600 frame/s at 432×192, and 1200 frame/s at 336×96. The burst shots are at full resolution. The EX-FC100 records 480×360 at 210 frame/s, 224×168 at 420 frame/s, and 224×64 at 1,000 frame/s. The Casio EX-FH25 is able to shoot at up to 1,000 frame/s at 224×64.

Bundled software
 PhotoLoader — Casio's software to automatically copy pictures to a hard drive.
 Photohands — Casio's image editing software. Photohands allows rotation and resizing of images and print a picture with the date superimposed.
 Camera User's Guide — the manual for the camera.
 Adobe Acrobat Reader — to read the Camera User's Guide, which is a PDF.
 AVI Importer
 Ulead Movie Wizard — used for editing movies software (bundled with the EX-Z750, EX-V7 and EX-Z850).
 Dynamic Photo Manager — Used to view and edit dynamic photos

Table of models
Cameras whose model number ends in U (e.g. EX-Z4U) are models only released in North America, without some of the functions of the non-U models.

M models are based on the corresponding S model but also record audio (as WAV) and play back WAV and MP3.

Casio's NP-20 batteries are claimed to hold 700 mAh of charge, while the thicker NP-40 is rated for 1230 mAh and the NP-90 has 1700mAh..

References

External links 

 Casio Exilim official site
 Casio's Exilim product manuals
 Casio camera FAQs

Exilim
Live-preview digital cameras
Exilim
Cameras introduced in 2002
Products and services discontinued in 2018
2018 disestablishments in Japan